Agamura cruralis is a species of gecko found in Iran and Pakistan.

References

cruralis
Reptiles of Iran
Reptiles described in 1874
Taxa named by William Thomas Blanford